Dars Akhund (also Romanized as Dars Ākhūnd and Dars-e Ākhvond; also known as Dahāneh-ye Sākhū and Danān-i-Sākhu) is a village in Jolgeh-ye Musaabad Rural District, in the Central District of Torbat-e Jam County, Razavi Khorasan Province, Iran. At the 2006 census, its population was 508, in 105 families.

References 

Populated places in Torbat-e Jam County